Helen M. Schultz (February  12,  1898 – 1974), known as "Iowa's Bus Queen," founded a U.S. bus company during the industry's formative years. In 1924, she founded the Red Ball Transportation Company, whose routes extended across northern Iowa,

Family and education
Helen Mary Schultz was the second child of Joseph Schultz and  Mary  Schultz, who were farmers in the region of Nashua, Iowa, and Shell Lake, Wisconsin. After finishing school, she attended a business college in Duluth, Minnesota, where she trained as a stenographer. She worked at various businesses, from some of which she gained useful knowledge about the transportation industries. 

In 1925, she married Donald Brewer, who later became a farmer. They had two children, Donald and Mary.

Business career
In the 1920s, the U.S. bus transportation industry was in its formative years, and bus companies were small businesses, often family owned and usually started by men. Schultz decided she wanted to start her own bus company in Iowa, and as banks of the day rarely made business loans to women, she raised crucial capital from a building contractor named Emmett Butler, for whom she had worked at one time. In 1922, she incorporated as the Red Ball Transportation  Company, which she named after the so-called Red Ball Route (now Highway 218), which runs between St. Paul, Minnesota, and St. Louis, Missouri. She started operations on a modest scale, with one bus making twice-daily round-trips between Charles City, Iowa (where the company was initially headquartered), and  Waterloo.

At the outset, Schultz served as general manager of the company as well as its bookkeeper and mechanic. She ran into many early difficulties, such as bad roads, breakdowns, and thin ridership. Her first driver was her brother and he quit almost immediately, though he later re-entered the business as a partner. She persevered and in her first year of business acquired two more buses and added trips between Waterloo and Mason City, a regional trading hub. 

Schultz quickly acquired direct competitors such as the Speedway Motor Coach Company. The established railroads also saw her as a potential competitor and involved her in costly legal battles over route rights, some of which she lost. In the continuing fight with the railroads, she turned to publicity to aid her cause, promoting herself as a plucky upstart, and it was in this period that the Des Moines Register nicknamed  her the "Iowa  Bus Queen." Winning a crucial favorable ruling from the Iowa Board of Railroad  Commissioners, Red Ball continued to grow; and by the fall of 1923 it was the leading bus company in Iowa, with 11 large coaches and a reputation for reliability. By the late 1920s, it had routes extending through the northern half of the state, connecting such cities as Des Moines, Mason City, Charles City, Waterloo, Spirit Lake, and Algona, as well 

In the later 1920s, Red Ball's expansion plans stalled while transportation-related taxes (e.g. wheelage taxes) and competition increased, and it began losing money. Red Ball's buses were aging and Schultz did not have the capital to invest in new ones or in necessary  buildings like ticket offices, waiting rooms, and garages. On top of this, an emergent cadre of interstate bus companies posed a new threat to companies like Red Ball. In 1930, Schultz decided to sell her company to the Minnesota-based Jefferson Highway Transportation Company, which remains in business today.

Schultz moved on to other ventures, including an auto service station, and eventually inherited her father's farm. She died in 1974.

References

1890s births
1974 deaths
American women company founders
American company founders
People in bus transport
People from Iowa